José Vítor dos Santos Peseiro (born 4 April 1960) is a Portuguese football manager and former player who played as a forward. He is the manager of the Nigeria national team.

After an unassuming career as a player, he went on to coach several clubs in his country, including Sporting CP – which he took to the 2005 UEFA Cup Final– and Porto. He also worked extensively in Arab nations, being in charge of the Saudi Arabia national team.

Playing career
Born in Coruche, Santarém District, Peseiro never played in higher than the Segunda Liga as a professional, starting out at Sport Lisboa e Cartaxo in 1979. In that competition, he represented Amora FC, Clube Oriental de Lisboa, GD Samora Correia and S.C.U. Torreense, for a total of five seasons.

34-year-old Peseiro retired at the end of the 1993–94 season in the fourth division, with local club União de Santarém.

Coaching career

Beginnings
Peseiro spent his first eight years as a manager in the third and fourth tiers of Portuguese football, starting out as a player-coach at his last team. In summer 1999 he was appointed at C.D. Nacional, which he helped promote to the Primeira Liga in just three seasons. In 2002–03, he led the team to a final 11th position.

In 2003–04, Peseiro assisted Carlos Queiroz at Real Madrid. At the end of the campaign, after the team lost a considerable advantage on the table to be finally surpassed by Valencia CF, FC Barcelona and Deportivo de La Coruña, the pair was sacked, and the latter returned to his assistant position in Manchester United.

Sporting CP
Peseiro signed with Sporting CP for 2004–05. After collecting three losses and two draws in his first nine games in charge, the side eventually finished in third place with 61 points, four behind champions S.L. Benfica; additionally, he coached the team to a runner-up run in the UEFA Cup after disposing of the likes of Feyenoord, Middlesbrough and Newcastle United. The final was played at the Estádio José Alvalade, and after a 1–0 lead at half-time the hosts eventually succumbed to PFC CSKA Moscow 3–1.

At the start of the 2005–06 season, the Lions were ousted from the UEFA Champions League by Udinese Calcio, and after being relegated to the UEFA Cup they were immediately knocked out by Halmstads BK 4–4 on aggregate after a 2–3 home loss. On 16 October 2005, following a 0–1 home defeat to Académica de Coimbra that saw Sporting sink to the seventh position, he resigned.

Eastern Europe, Saudi Arabia
In the 2007 off-season, Peseiro was named manager of Panathinaikos FC. After failing to win the Super League Greece and also losing 4–0 to neighbouring Olympiacos F.C. in the domestic cup, he was forced to step down.

In June 2008, Peseiro signed a three-year contract with Romanian club FC Rapid București. On 2 October, after being eliminated from the UEFA Cup by VfL Wolfsburg, he was sacked only to be reinstated a few days later; he eventually resigned on 12 January 2009, after failing to agree on a new deal.

Peseiro succeeded Nasser Al-Johar at the helm of the Saudi Arabia national team in 2009, during the 2010 FIFA World Cup qualifying campaign. His first game occurred on 28 March, and it ended with a 2–1 away win over Iran which was the former's first ever victory in that country and the latter's first loss in nearly 40 home games; eventually, the nation failed to reach the finals in South Africa, and on 10 January 2011 he was relieved of his duties after losing the first game in the AFC Asian Cup against Syria.

Braga
On 3 June 2012, Peseiro was appointed at S.C. Braga. His first major signing was Portuguese international Rúben Micael, and he qualified the club to the group stage of the Champions League for the second time in its history, after ousting Udinese on penalties.

At the end of the campaign, in spite of winning the Taça da Liga and ranking fourth in the league, Braga and Peseiro reached an agreement to terminate the manager's contract.

Al-Wahda and Al-Ahly
From 11 November 2013 to 11 January 2015, Peseiro worked with Al Wahda FC in the UAE Pro League. On 9 October of the latter year, Al Ahly SC announced his signing; upon hearing the news, fans of the latter protested against the decision based on his weak résumé.

Return to Portugal
On 18 January 2016, after cutting ties with the Egyptian side, Peseiro replaced Julen Lopetegui at FC Porto. Even though the third position the team occupied at the time of the Spaniard's dismissal was still secured, he collected more losses than his predecessor, and also lost the final of the Taça de Portugal to former team Braga, on penalties.

On 6 June 2016, Peseiro signed a two-year deal with precisely Braga. On 14 December, following consecutive home defeats that resulted in elimination from the Europa League and the Portuguese Cup, respectively at the hands of FC Shakhtar Donetsk (2–4) and S.C. Covilhã (1–2), he was fired.

Peseiro returned to the UAE in January 2017 with Sharjah FC, and was sacked nine months later after a poor start to the new season. The following February, he went home to sign a contract at Vitória S.C. until June 2019, which he rescinded by mutual agreement a year early.

In July 2018, Peseiro returned to Sporting after 13 years away, assuming the reins at a club that had lost several key players following fan violence and whose previous manager Siniša Mihajlović lasted nine days in the job. On 1 November, following poor overall performances and a 1–2 home loss against G.D. Estoril Praia for the group stage of the Taça da Liga, he was relieved of his duties.

Venezuela
Peseiro returned to national team duties on 4 February 2020, being appointed by Venezuela after the resignation of Rafael Dudamel. He made his debut on 9 October in a 3–0 loss away to Colombia in 2022 FIFA World Cup qualification; the opponents were led by compatriot Carlos Queiroz.

At the 2021 Copa América in Brazil, Venezuela was eliminated from the group stage with two draws and two defeats; Peseiro was praised by pundit Tim Vickery for achieving those results despite a spate of COVID-19 infections and virus-related travel restrictions that kept key forward Salomón Rondón in China. He resigned in August, having not been paid for over a year amidst the South American country's economic crisis.

Nigeria
On 29 December 2021, Peseiro reached a verbal agreement with the Nigeria Football Federation to replace Gernot Rohr at the helm of the national team. He was supposed to travel to the 2021 Africa Cup of Nations in Cameroon, but strictly as an "observer" while interim manager Augustine Eguavoen led the side to the last 16; the deal eventually fell through, as Eguavoen was retained at the end of the tournament.

On 15 May 2022, Peseiro was finally appointed as the new head coach.

Managerial statistics

Honours
Nacional
Segunda Divisão: 1999–00
AF Madeira Cup: 2001–02

Sporting CP
UEFA Cup runner-up: 2004–05

Braga
Taça da Liga: 2012–13

Al Ahly
Egyptian Premier League: 2015–16

Porto
Taça de Portugal runner-up: 2015–16

References

External links

 

1960 births
Living people
Sportspeople from Santarém District
Portuguese footballers
Association football forwards
Liga Portugal 2 players
Segunda Divisão players
Clube Oriental de Lisboa players
Amora F.C. players
S.C.U. Torreense players
A.C. Alcanenense players
Portuguese football managers
Primeira Liga managers
Liga Portugal 2 managers
União Montemor managers
C.D. Nacional managers
Sporting CP managers
S.C. Braga managers
FC Porto managers
Vitória S.C. managers
Saudi Professional League managers
Al Hilal SFC managers
Super League Greece managers
Panathinaikos F.C. managers
Liga I managers
FC Rapid București managers
UAE Pro League managers
Al-Sharjah SCC managers
Egyptian Premier League managers
Al Ahly SC managers
Saudi Arabia national football team managers
2011 AFC Asian Cup managers
Venezuela national football team managers
2021 Copa América managers
Nigeria national football team managers
Portuguese expatriate football managers
Expatriate football managers in Saudi Arabia
Expatriate football managers in Greece
Expatriate football managers in Romania
Expatriate football managers in the United Arab Emirates
Expatriate football managers in Egypt
Expatriate football managers in Venezuela
Expatriate football managers in Nigeria
Portuguese expatriate sportspeople in Spain
Portuguese expatriate sportspeople in Saudi Arabia
Portuguese expatriate sportspeople in Greece
Portuguese expatriate sportspeople in Romania
Portuguese expatriate sportspeople in the United Arab Emirates
Portuguese expatriate sportspeople in Egypt
Portuguese expatriate sportspeople in Nigeria
Real Madrid CF non-playing staff